Barrelene is a bicyclic organic compound with chemical formula C8H8 and systematic name bicyclo[2.2.2]octa-2,5,7-triene. First synthesized and described by Howard Zimmerman in 1960, the name derives from the resemblance to a barrel, with the staves being three ethylene units attached to two methine groups. It is the formal Diels–Alder adduct of benzene and acetylene. Due to its unusual molecular geometry, the compound is of considerable interest to theoretical chemists.

Iptycenes, with the alkene groups part of an arenes,  are related compounds. It is also a starting material for many other organic compounds, such as semibullvalene.

The original Zimmerman, synthesis modified in 1969, starts from coumalic acid:

Many alternative routes have been devised since then, one of them starting from benzene oxide:  

An alternate route that allows synthesis of the parent barrelene system and a variety of substituted barrelenes has also been reported

Barrelene reactions
Barrelene is hydrogenated with hydrogen gas and Adams' catalyst in ethanol to the fully saturated bicyclo[2.2.2]-octane. Bromination with bromine in tetrachloromethane gives a di-bromo adduct because a coupling reaction intervenes:

Epoxidation of barrelene with oxone gives the trioxatrishomobarrelene which on rearrangement with boron trifluoride (driving force:relief of strain energy) converts into the trioxatrishomocubane:

This compound can be envisioned as a cubane with three oxygen atoms inserted into three opposite edges or as 9-crown-3 capped by two methine units. The molecule is chiral and the separate enantiomers have been isolated.

Certain barrelenes have been used as a monomer in a ring opening metathesis polymerization : 

The catalyst is a Fischer carbene (a molybdenum bis-(hexafluoro-tert-butoxy) carbene catalyst) and the long alkyl chain attached to the monomer is required for solubility. Oxidation of the polymer with DDQ affords the naphthalene pendant of poly(p-phenylene vinylene).

Isopentane solutions of barrelene undergo photolytic isomerisation when acetone is added as a photosensitizer to produce semibullvalene.  Prolonged irradiation results in further isomerisation to form cyclooctatetraene.

References

Cycloalkenes
Bicyclic compounds